The 1934–35 New York Americans season was the Americans' tenth season of play.

Offseason

Regular season

Final standings

Record vs. opponents

Game log

Playoffs
They didn't qualify for the playoffs

Player stats

Regular season
Scoring

Goaltending

Awards and records

Transactions

See also
1934–35 NHL season

References

External links
 

New York Americans seasons
New York Americans
New York Americans
New York Amer
New York Amer
1930s in Manhattan
Madison Square Garden